Manuel Reynaert (born 5 June 1985 in Saint-Pol-sur-Mer, Nord) is a track and field sprint athlete who competes internationally for France.

Reynaert represented France at the 2008 Summer Olympics in Beijing. He competed at the 4x100 metres relay together with Martial Mbandjock, Yannick Lesourd and Samuel Coco-Viloin. In their qualification heat they placed sixth in a time of 39.53 seconds and they were eliminated.

References

1985 births
Living people
People from Saint-Pol-sur-Mer
French male sprinters
Olympic athletes of France
Athletes (track and field) at the 2008 Summer Olympics
Université Savoie-Mont Blanc alumni
Sportspeople from Nord (French department)